Prunus haussknechtii is a species of wild almond native to Iran. It is shrub or small tree 1-2 mtall, sometimes reaching 4m, with pink flowers. It prefers to grow at 1200 to 3600m above sea level, near water, either riverbanks or mountain bases where there is melting snow. It has the largest nut and seed of the 17 species of almond.

References

haussknechtii
Endemic flora of Iran
Plants described in 1905